Rhoda Bryan Billings (born September 30, 1937) is an American lawyer and a former justice of the North Carolina Supreme Court.

Billings is a native of Wilkesboro, North Carolina. She earned her law degree from Wake Forest University School of Law in 1966. She served four years as a state District Court judge (1968–1972). From 1982 to 1984 Billings served on the Board of Governors of the North Carolina Bar Association. Governor James G. Martin, a fellow Republican, appointed her to the North Carolina Supreme Court as an associate justice in 1985, after the resignation of Justice Earl W. Vaughn. When Chief Justice Joseph Branch retired, Martin then appointed her Chief Justice in 1986, making her the second woman to head the Court. She was defeated by James G. Exum in the election for chief justice in November of that year.

Justice Billings became a law professor at Wake Forest University, retiring in 2003 as Professor Emeritus. Billings was named in 2008 to the National Committee on the Right to Counsel established by the Constitution Project of Georgetown University's Public Policy Institute and the National Legal Aid and Defender Association.

See also
List of female state supreme court justices

References

External links
NC Supreme Court Historical Society

Wake Forest University School of Law alumni
Wake Forest University faculty
Chief Justices of the North Carolina Supreme Court
Living people
1937 births
Women chief justices of state supreme courts in the United States
American women judges
People from Wilkesboro, North Carolina
Constitution Project
American women academics
21st-century American women
20th-century American women judges
20th-century American judges